Diang is a chiefdom in Koinadugu District of Sierra Leone with a population of 19,700. Its principal town is Kondembaia.  Lake Sonfon is located in the chiefdom an inland mountain lake of religious and cultural significance.There are two ruling houses namely, Ferekeya and Magbaia for Paramount Chieftency in Diang Chiefdom.

References

Chiefdoms of Sierra Leone
Northern Province, Sierra Leone

Notable people from Diang Chiefdom are: (1) Honorable Daniel Ferenkeh Koroma, former member of the Sierra Leone Parliament and Minister of Trade and Industry. (2) Daniel Amara Konah Koroma, U.S. government official in Montgomery County, Maryland. www.DanielKoroma.com